East Boone Township is one of twenty-four townships in Bates County, Missouri, and is part of the Kansas City metropolitan area within the USA.  As of the 2000 census, its population was 482.

East Boone Township derives its name from the pioneer Daniel Boone.

Geography
According to the United States Census Bureau, East Boone Township covers an area of 31.87 square miles (82.56 square kilometers); of this, 31.84 square miles (82.46 square kilometers, 99.88 percent) is land and 0.04 square miles (0.09 square kilometers, 0.11 percent) is water.

Unincorporated towns
 Burdett at 
 Lacyville at 
(This list is based on USGS data and may include former settlements.)

Adjacent townships
 Everett Township, Cass County (north)
 Austin Township, Cass County (northeast)
 Deer Creek Township (east)
 Mound Township (southeast)
 Elkhart Township (south)
 West Point Township (southwest)
 West Boone Township (west)

Cemeteries
The township contains Burdett Cemetery.

School districts
 Adrian County R-III

Political districts
 Missouri's 4th congressional district
 State House District 125
 State Senate District 31

References
 United States Census Bureau 2008 TIGER/Line Shapefiles
 United States Board on Geographic Names (GNIS)
 United States National Atlas

External links
 US-Counties.com
 City-Data.com

Townships in Bates County, Missouri
Townships in Missouri